The Lewis Store, also known as the Fielding Lewis Store, is a historic commercial building located at Fredericksburg, Virginia. It was built in 1749, and is a two-story, front-gable, three-bay Georgian style brick store. The second story addition was built in 1808.  The building was rehabilitated between 2000 and 2006.  The first story consists of a "sales room" on the front and a "counting room" on the rear.  The building functioned as a store until 1823, after which it was used as a residence.  It was built by John Lewis and operated by him and his son, Fielding Lewis, who was married to George Washington's sister Betty Washington Lewis.  Fielding and Betty Lewis built the nearby Kenmore.  The Lewis family sold the store in 1776.

It was listed on the National Register of Historic Places in 2013.  It is located in the Fredericksburg Historic District.

References

Commercial buildings on the National Register of Historic Places in Virginia
Georgian architecture in Virginia
Commercial buildings completed in 1749
Buildings and structures in Fredericksburg, Virginia
National Register of Historic Places in Fredericksburg, Virginia
Individually listed contributing properties to historic districts on the National Register in Virginia